Law Wing-Cheong (born 26 June 1966), also known as Vincent Lo, is a Hong Kong film editor, an assistant director, film director, and actor. He is best known for collaborating as an associate director for films made by Johnnie To and Wai Ka-Fai of Milkyway Image.

Biography
Law began working for Johnnie To as an assistant director at TVB Studios in 1990. Later, when To left the TV studio, Law continued to work as a director there for three years. In 1997, Law was recruited by To to join his company, Milkyway Image, where he began to work as an assistant director for To. Gradually, Law was promoted to become his associate director.

Law describes being an associate director as having to think faster than the director, as well as handling some of the less complicated scenes for the director and making all kinds of job distributions on the set.

Law made his directorial debut with a segment in the horror omnibus Ghost Office, followed by the cat-and-mouse thriller Running Out of Time 2 which won him an award for Best Film Editing at The 39th Golden Horse Awards.

Filmography

Awards and nominations

External links

 Cinespot : An Exclusive Interview with Hong Kong Director Law Wing-Cheong

Living people
Hong Kong male film actors
Hong Kong film directors
Hong Kong film producers
Hong Kong Mandopop singers
Hong Kong male television actors
20th-century Hong Kong male actors
21st-century Hong Kong male actors
1966 births